The Foolish Virgin is a 1916 American silent drama film directed by Albert Capellani and starring Clara Kimball Young, Conway Tearle, and Paul Capellani. It was shot at Fort Lee in New Jersey. Future star Rudolph Valentino appeared as an uncredited extra.

It was adapted from Thomas Dixon's book and was marketed as "a worthy successor" to the film The Common Law.

Cast

References

Bibliography
 Donald W. McCaffrey & Christopher P. Jacobs. Guide to the Silent Years of American Cinema. Greenwood Publishing, 1999.

External links
 

1916 films
1916 drama films
1910s English-language films
American silent feature films
Silent American drama films
Films directed by Albert Capellani
American black-and-white films
Selznick Pictures films
Films shot in Fort Lee, New Jersey
1916 lost films
Lost drama films
1910s American films